Maria Fernanda Ferreira (born 22 September 1960) is a cognitive psychologist known for empirical investigations in psycholinguistics and language processing. Ferreira is Professor of Psychology and the Principal investigator of the Ferreira Lab at University of California, Davis.

In 1995, Ferreira was awarded the Distinguished Scientific Award for Early Career Contribution to Psychology for cognition and human learning by the American Psychological Association. She is a Fellow of the Association for Psychological Science, the Cognitive Science Society, and the Royal Society of Edinburgh (FRSE).

Biography 
Ferreira received her BA (Honours) in Psychology from the University of Manitoba in 1982. She went on to complete postgraduate work at the University of Massachusetts, Amherst, obtaining degrees in Linguistics (MA 1986) and Psychology (MS 1985, PhD 1988). At U Mass Amherst. Ferreira worked under the supervision of Charles (Chuck) Clifton, Jr investigating relationships between syntactic processing and phonology. Her dissertation, "Planning and Timing in Sentence Production: The Syntax-to-Phonology Conversion," provided evidence that phonological structures and representations, rather than syntactic structures, impact the timing of sentence-level speech.

Ferreira served as Programme Director for Linguistics for the National Science Foundation from 1996-1997. From 2004 until 2006, Ferreira was the Director of the Center for the Integrated Study of Vision and Language at Michigan State University. She was Chair of Language and Cognition and Professor in Psychology at the University of Edinburgh from 2006 until 2010.

Ferreira is an editor of Collabra: Psychology, an open access psychology journal published by the University of California Press.  She is also an associate editor of the journal Cognitive Psychology. She previously served as an associate editor of  the Journal of Experimental Psychology (1997–2000) and the Journal of Memory and Language  (2001–2004).

Ferreira was born in Portugal, and raised in Manitoba, Canada. She is married to John Henderson, a frequent collaborator and fellow professor at the University of California, Davis. They met whilst they both read at University of Massachusetts, Amherst. Her younger brother, Victor Ferreira, is also a psycholinguist, and a Professor of Psychology at the University of California, San Diego.

Research 
Ferreira's research seeks to investigate the processes which allows for efficient comprehension and production of speech. One of Ferreira's theoretical contributions to the field of syntactic processing and representation is the Good Enough theory of sentence processing.  Good Enough theory posits that listeners, when processing linguistic input, engage in satisficing rather than constructing fully detailed representations. That is, the language processing system develops partial or superficial representations, which are "good enough" for the task they are meant to perform. Further, these representations, which may be inaccurate when dealing with difficult input (e.g. garden path sentences), may persist after syntactic reanalysis. Ferreira's work on comprehension errors in adults reading passive sentences further supports the Good Enough model. This model of syntactic representation challenged the theories that held that sentence processing mechanisms generated fully complete and accurate representations.  Among her methodological contributions is the auditory moving-window technique, which was used to assess influences of prosody, lexical frequency, and syntactic complexity in spoken-language comprehension.

Books 

Fodor, J. D. & Ferreira, F. (Eds.) (1998). Reanalysis in sentence processing. Springer Verlag.
Henderson, J., & Ferreira, F. (Eds.) (2004). The interface of language, vision, and action: Eye movements and the visual world. Psychology Press.  
Henderson, J. M., Singer, M., & Ferreira, F. (Eds.). (1995). Reading and language processing. Psychology Press.

Representative publications 

 Ferreira, F., & Clifton Jr, C. (1986). The independence of syntactic processing. Journal of Memory and Language, 25 (3), 348-368. doi.org/10.1016/0749-596X(86)90006-9
 Ferreira, F., Bailey, K. G., & Ferraro, V. (2002). Good-enough representations in language comprehension. Current Directions in Psychological Science,11 (1), 11-15. doi.org/10.1111/1467-8721.0
Ferreira, F. (2003). The misinterpretation of noncanonical sentences. Cognitive Psychology, 47, 164-203.0158.doi.org/10.1016/S0010-0285(03)00005-7
Ferreira, F., & Patson, N. D. (2007). The ‘good enough’ approach to language comprehension. Language and Linguistics Compass, 1, 71-83.doi.org/10.1111/j.1749-818X.2007.00007.x

References

External links 

Faculty homepage at the University of California, Davis
Ferreira Lab
 

Women psychologists
American cognitive psychologists
Psycholinguists
University of California, Davis faculty
University of Massachusetts Amherst alumni
University of Manitoba alumni
Living people
1960 births